Monica Marulli (born March 10, 1975) is an Italian volleyball player. She currently plays for Tena Santeramo.

References

1975 births
Italian women's volleyball players
Living people
Place of birth missing (living people)